Picton railway station was a railway station serving the village of Picton in North Yorkshire, England. Located on the Northallerton to Eaglescliffe Line (which is now the North TransPennine line) it was opened on 2 June 1852 by the Leeds Northern Railway. It closed to passengers on 4 January 1960 and closed completely in July 1964.

History

Local services started at the station with the opening of the Leeds Northern Railway and then along the Battersby line when the first section to  opened in 1857.

With the full opening of the line to Grosmont in 1865, four out and back services to Whitby per day were worked along the Battersby line. The timetable from 1906 shows that the station had five stopping services each way on both lines; the services south went to Northallerton and the services on the line to Stokesley originated in Stockton and ran through to Whitby. By 1922, this was down to four services on the Battersby line, and by the time of the closure of that line to passengers in 1954, the service ran to only two trains per day through Picton.

The station remained open for a further six years for local services on the Northallerton to Eaglescliffe line, and was closed to passengers in 1960. The station closed to goods traffic in January 1964, with the goods yard being used by a stone merchant. The stationmasters house still stands, but the other buildings have all been demolished.

The line through the site remains open as part of the Northallerton to Eaglescliffe line.

References

Sources

Disused railway stations in North Yorkshire
Railway stations in Great Britain opened in 1852
Railway stations in Great Britain closed in 1960
Former North Eastern Railway (UK) stations
1852 establishments in England